The 2011 All Thailand Golf Tour was the 13th season of the All Thailand Golf Tour, the main professional golf tour in Thailand since it was established in 1999.

Michael Tran made history at the Singha Classic as he became the first Vietnamese golfer to win a professional tournament.

Schedule
The following tables list official events during the 2012 season.

Men's events

Women's events

Notes

References

All Thailand Golf Tour
All Thailand Golf Tour